Pöppelsche  is a river of North Rhine-Westphalia, Germany. It flows into the Gieseler near Erwitte.

Urban Legends
Local legend states that in 1855, a young boy living in the village became horribly sick with measles and eventually died. His mother who wished to cleanse her son's body of blood and infection, laid him in the river. Miraculously, after being placed in the river, the boy's body allegedly became warm again and woke up alive and well, and without any symptoms of the disease. It is unconfirmed if this legend is true or not, but ever since it has been custom within the town of Berge to soak sick individuals with a cloth full of water form the river.

See also
List of rivers of North Rhine-Westphalia

References

Rivers of North Rhine-Westphalia
Rivers of Germany